Jaelin is a given name. Notable people with the name include:

 Jaelin Howell (born 1999), American soccer player
 Jaelin Kauf (born 1996), American freestyle skier
 Jaelin Williams (born 1997), American-Bahamian soccer player

See also
 Jaelen